Scott Sonnon is a martial art expert, creator of The Saddle SAMBO System, fitness coach, dyslexia advocate and wellness speaker. He has worked with movie stars such as Peta Wilson and fashion designer Donna Karan as well as Ultimate Fighting Championship mixed martial arts fighters such as Alberto Crane, Jorge Rivera, Andrei Arlovski, and Elvis Sinosic. He currently leads Human Performance for the United States Department of Energy and United States military special operations research in breathing techniques to improve performance and selection rates.

Scott Sonnon was voted one of "The 6 Most Influential Martial Artists of the 21st Century" by Black Belt Magazine in 2010.

As a dyslexic, institutionalized as a child, Scott Sonnon became a TED Fellow speaking on the nature of multiple learning styles being misdiagnosed as learning disabilities, and now travels the country giving talks advocating congressional legislation (House Resolution 456) for dyslexia educational support in public schools.

Scott Sonnon was named one of "Top 25 Fitness Trainers in the World" by "Men's Fitness Magazine" in 2011. He was named by Men's Health Magazine, the creator of the "World's Smartest Workout" (called TACFIT) in 2014. He is a global staff trainer for the 2014 Nike Academy.

His fitness system, Circular Strength Training, has been adopted by members of the United States military and law enforcement community. He is also a published author, a public speaker, and  an advocate in the fight against childhood obesity.

Early life
Sonnon was born in 1969, in Pennsylvania, USA. His family emigrated to the United States two generations before him from the town of Sonnon, district of Passau, Bavaria, Germany.  He overcame being legally blind due to myopia and Thygeson's disease, spending his youth in pain with Osteochondrosis and obesity, and suffering learning disabilities such as dyslexia. Sonnon is a member of Mensa International and has been a keynote speaker for the High IQ organization.

Training
Sonnon is credited as having reintroduced Indian clubs in the form of clubbells to strength training. By 2007 he had been inducted into three halls of fame: the National Fitness Hall of Fame, the International Martial Arts Hall of Fame and the Personal Trainer Hall of Fame, and is known to the Sambo and Russian martial arts communities. It has been reported that he is so highly regarded in Sambo training that people have been known to fly thousands of miles in order to attend one of his workshops.

Career highlights

Bibliography
RMAX Magazine (2003–2008) ISSN 1555-7723
Mastering Sambo for Mixed Martial Arts (2008) 
Free to Move: The Intu-Flow Longevity System (2008) 
Prasara Yoga: Flow Beyond Thought (2007) 
The Big Book of Clubbell Training (2006) 
Clubbell Training for Circular Strength: An Ancient Tool for the Modern Athlete (2003) 
Body-Flow: Freedom from Fear-Reactivity (2003)

References

External links
Scott Sonnon, the Flow Coach
 How we suppress genius and create learning disability, talk at TEDxBellingham, November 2013. (Also on YouTube.)

American male mixed martial artists
People from Hershey, Pennsylvania
1969 births
Living people
Mensans